Three ships of the United States Navy have been named Canopus after the first magnitude star Canopus in the constellation Argo.

  was launched in 1919 by the New York Shipbuilding Company as the Santa Leonora.
  (ordered as AS-27, but reclassified before keel-laying) was a destroyer tender, but construction was canceled in 1945 prior to launching.
  was launched on 12 February 1965.

Sources
 

United States Navy ship names